Annette Snell (March 22, 1945 – April 4, 1977) was an American rhythm and blues singer who recorded in the 1960s and 1970s.  She died in the Southern Airways Flight 242 crash.

Biography
She was born Annetta Snell in Sandersville, Georgia, and in the early 1960s was a member of a vocal backing group, the Mar-Vells.  She then became a member of the girl group the Fabulettes, who made several recordings in 1965 and 1966. In 1968, Snell left the group to go to New York, and then to Nashville, Tennessee, to pursue a solo career. Under the name Annetta, she recorded "Since There Is No More You" with Paul Kelly. Kelly then brought her to the attention of record producer and music publisher Buddy Killen. More singles came, all written by Kelly, and her greatest success was achieved with the number-19 Billboard rhythm and blues hit "You Oughta' Be Here With Me" in 1973.  She followed it up with two more R&B chart hits, also released on the Dial label, the following year, "Get Your Thing Together" (number 44) and "Just as Hooked As I’ve Been" (number 71).

Snell then won a deal to record an album for Epic Records in Muscle Shoals, Alabama with the session musicians known as the Swampers. They initially produced one unreleased single, "Promises Should Never Be Broken," and Snell returned for a further session in early 1977.  She was returning home via Atlanta after working on tracks for the album when her flight, Southern Airways Flight 242, crashed in New Hope, Georgia during a severe thunderstorm on April 4, 1977.  She was buried in Dade North Memorial Park Cemetery in Opa-locka, Florida.

Snell was married to Pete Jackson of Touch of Class.

References

External links
Classic and rare Soul Sisters 50s–70s : Annette Snell : The collection (1970–1977) 
Discography at Soulful Kinda Music
Annette Snell at Discogs.com

1945 births
1977 deaths
Accidental deaths in Georgia (U.S. state)
20th-century African-American women singers
American rhythm and blues singers
Musicians from Miami
Victims of aviation accidents or incidents in 1977
Victims of aviation accidents or incidents in the United States
20th-century American singers
20th-century American women singers
Musicians killed in aviation accidents or incidents